The 63U-11 virus (63UV) is a strain of Marituba virus in the genus Orthobunyavirus.

References 

Orthobunyaviruses